The 2007 CAF Beach Soccer championship also known as the 2007 FIFA Beach Soccer World Cup qualifiers for (CAF) was the second beach soccer championship for Africa, held in July 2007, in Durban, South Africa.
Nigeria won the championship, with Senegal finishing second. The two moved on to play in the 2007 FIFA Beach Soccer World Cup in Rio de Janeiro, Brazil from November 2 - November 11.

Participating nations

Group stage

Group A

Group B

Knockout stage

Winners

Final standings

References 

Beach Soccer Championship
FIFA Beach Soccer World Cup qualification (CAF)
2007
2007 in beach soccer